Brotherhood of Blades II: The Infernal Battlefield is a 2017 Chinese wuxia film directed by Lu Yang. It is a prequel to the 2014 film Brotherhood of Blades. Set in the Ming dynasty (1368-1644), the story follows Shen Lian, captain of the embroidered uniform guard (锦衣卫; pinyin: Jǐnyīwèi) the imperial secret police of the court, as he searches for the truth behind a conspiracy that framed him, his colleague Pei Lun and a young woman named Bei Zhai. Starring Chang Chen, Yang Mi and Zhang Yi, the film was released in China on July 19, 2017.

Plot

The film starts with the Battle of Sarhu, where the Ming dynasty army has been overrun by the Later Jin forces. A Ming soldier, Shen Lian, saves Lu Wenzhao from Jin soldiers who were rounding up and executing any remaining Ming soldiers.

8 years later, Shen Lian (Chang Chen) is a Captain of the guards in Southern Beijing. Lu Wenzhao is his superior officer who endears himself to the higher-ups by using any possible way. On a case related to the death of Master Guo, he is forced by a rival Lieutenant Ling, to pursue and arrest his subordinate Yin Cheng for an alcohol-induced rant against the Emperor. However, Yin Cheng commits suicide. To pray for his subordinate's soul to be released from purgatory, Shen Lian buys Bei Zhai paintings from a monk, Master Jinghai, who commends Shen Lian on his frequent purchase of Bei Zhai paintings. On his way, he gets caught in the rain, and is offered shelter under an umbrella by an unknown woman, who, despite him being in the Imperial uniform, is not afraid of him.

At the same time, Lu Wenzhao is trying to appease the powerful court eunuch Master Wei to gain his favor. Accordingly, he orders Lieutenant Ling, Master Wei's nephew, to kill Bei Zhai, who is maligning Master Wei's reputation through her paintings. Shen Lian tags along to see if its Bei Zhai, the painter. On reaching the house, they discover that Bei Zhai (Yang Mi) is a woman, the same one who gave Shen Lian shelter from the rain. When Lieutenant Ling tries to rape Bei Zhai before killing her, Shen Lian protests, and a fight erupts between the two, which culminates in Shen Lian accidentally killing Ling. Bei Zhai, having witnessed this, escapes, with Shen Lian too injured to pursue her. Shen Lian covers up his role in Ling's death and gives a statement that two assassins ambushed them and killed Ling. The case is being handled by Captain Pei Lun, who seems to have a dislike for Captain Shen Lian. It is later revealed that Yin Cheng was Pei Lun's only friend, and that he hates Shen Lian for the death of Yin Cheng.

A group of assassins contact Shen Lian to reveal that they know of his role in Ling's death, and that they will expose him using Bei Zhai if he does not set fire to the Imperial Archives. Left with no other choice, Shen Lian complies, but deduces that the assassins were actually targeting the construction log book of a dragon ship that sank on Lake Taiye with the Emperor on board.  The log book could furnish evidence that this was an attempt on the life of the Emperor, who has been bedridden with pneumonia ever since the sinking. Shen Lian burns the archive, but keeps the log book. When the assassins, having seen that the archive has been burnt, try to kill Shen Lian, he threatens them with the exposure of the log book if anything happens to him. He offers to exchange Bei Zhai for the log book and leaves. Shen Lian later encounters Bei Zhai at his home; she is looking for the log book, which is important to keep the name of the man she loves being maligned. Captain Pei Lun mistakes her for Shen Lian's wife.

After imprisoning Master Jinghai, who is the only known person who sells Bei Zhai paintings, Pei Lun deduces Shen Lian to be involved in Ling's murder, and presents his findings to Lu Wenzhao privately. However, it turns out that Lu Wenzhao is working with the assassins and stabs Pei Lun in the back, who escaped barely alive to be found by Shen Lian and Bei Zhai, who nurses him and reveals her true identity. Bei Zhai tells that person she loves had saved her life years ago when her family was murdered for expressing their views against the emperor, and that he had promised her to end the brutal rule of Master Wei and all those associated with him. Seeing that Bei Zhai intends to go to any length for the man she loves, Shen Lian allows her to leave with the log book, but she returns to him to help him and Pein Lun on seeing that they have been branded as criminals.

Shen Lian deduces that the Prince Zhou Youjian was Bei Zhai's lover, and goes to him to return the log book and keep Bei Zhai safe. However, the Prince, on seeing that Bei Zhai might be a loose end which could be used against him, offers Shen Lian freedom in exchange for him killing Bei Zhai. Shen Lian refuses, and leaves Beijing with Pei Lun and Bei Zhai, intending to go to Suzhou. However, the Prince orders his assassins, including Lu Wenzhao and Ding Baiying to pursue and kill them. At the same time, the Prince succeeds in convincing the eunuch Master Wei that he is being targeted by Lu Wenzhao, which prompts Master Wei to order the soldiers to eliminate Lu Wenzhao and everyone associated with him.

When Lu Wenzhao catches up to Shen Lian's group, Shen Lian convinces Bei Zhai to cross over to Yi mountain alone via a rope bridge, with him and Pei Lun staying behind to stop the pursuing forces. Though Shen Lian and Pei Lun get the better of Lu Wenzhao and Ding Baiying, the imperial forces ambush both groups, and Lu Wenzhao realizes that he has been played for a fool by the prince. Both groups try and fight back the imperial forces together. On seeing that Shen Lian might be in danger, Bei Zhai returns, which prompts Shen Lian to cut off the rope bridge to keep her safe. While Pei Lun, Ding Baiying and Lu Wenzhao are killed, Shen Lian is revealed to have survived and in prison. When the Prince comes to power, he expels Master Wei from the Royal Court, and reinstates Shen Lian as an Imperial soldier, though this time as a Lieutenant, which is the premise for the first movie, Brotherhood of Blades.

Cast
Chang Chen as Shen Lian
Yang Mi as Bei Zhai
Zhang Yi as Lu Wenzhao
Lei Jiayin as Pei Lun
Xin Zhilei as Ding Baiying
Chin Shih-chieh as Wei Zhongxian
Li Yuan as Ding Chong

Director
Lu Yang graduated from Beijing Film Academy and has a master's degree in directing. His first feature My Spectacular Theatre (2010) won the Audience Award at Busan International Film Festival 2010. Brotherhood of Blades (2014) is his second feature.

Reception
The film has grossed  in China.

Awards and nominations

References

External links
 

Chinese sequel films
Chinese martial arts films
Wuxia films
2010s Mandarin-language films
Films set in 17th-century Ming dynasty
Films set in the 1620s
2017 martial arts films
Films about revenge